Enzo Masetti (1893–1961) was an Italian composer.

Selected filmography
 Cavalry (1936)
 Tomb of the Angels (1937)
 Goodbye Youth (1940)
 Blood Wedding (1941)
 Old-Fashioned World (1941)
Headlights in the Fog (1942)
 The Gorgon (1942)
 Jealousy (1942)
 Farewell Love! (1943)
 The Priest's Hat (1944)
 The Materassi Sisters (1944)
 The Gates of Heaven (1945)
 A Day In the Life (1946)
 The Testimony (1946)
 The Adulteress (1946)
 Bullet for Stefano (1947)
 Heart and Soul (1948)
 Fabiola (1949)
 The Wolf of the Sila (1949)
 Sicilian Uprising (1949)
 Outlaw Girl (1950)
 Volcano (1950)
 Hearts at Sea (1950)
 The Fighting Men (1950)
 Il caimano del Piave (1951)
 Last Meeting (1951)
 Red Shirts (1952)
 Voice of Silence (1953)
 Attila (1954)
 Hercules (1958)
 Hercules Unchained (1959)

External links
 

1893 births
1961 deaths
Italian male composers
Musicians from Bologna
20th-century Italian composers
20th-century Italian male musicians